Cappetta is a surname. Notable people with the surname include:

Gary Michael Cappetta (born 1952), American professional wrestling ring announcer, author, and voice over artist
Henri Cappetta, French ichthyologist
Suzie Cappetta (1948–2007), American pop musician